The 2007 Polynesian Championships in Athletics took place between October 16–17, 2007. The event was held in Rarotonga, Cook Islands, in conjunction with the Cook Islands Secondary School Championships and the Cook Island National Track and Field Championships.  It was open for athletes aged under 19.  Detailed reports were given for the OAA, and for the French Polynesia Athletics Federation.

A total of 23 events were contested, 12 by men, 10 by women, and 1 mixed.

Medal summary
Complete results can be found on the Oceania Athletics Association webpage, and results for the first day on the webpage of the French Polynesia Athletics Federation (Fédération d'Athlétisme de Polynésie Française).

Men

Women

Mixed

†:  The B team was probably not eligible to win a medal.

Medal table
The medal table was published.

Participation
According to an unofficial count, 48 athletes from 5 countries participated.

 (6)
 (18)
 (7)
 (8)
 (9)

References

Polynesian Championships in Athletics
Athletics in the Cook Islands
Polynesia
2007 in Cook Islands sport
International sports competitions hosted by the Cook Islands